Rimrunners or variations thereof may refer to:

Rimrunners, a science fiction novel by C. J. Cherryh
Rim Runners, a spacefaring shipping line in A. Bertram Chandler's fictional universe
Rim Runner, a Las Vegas water ride
Rimrunner, a Commodore 64 game released in 1988